A list of books and essays about Fritz Lang:

Lang